Howard is an English-language given name originating from Old French Huard (or Houard) from a Germanic source similar to Old High German *Hugihard "heart-brave", or *Hoh-ward, literally "high defender; chief guardian". It is also probably in some cases a confusion with the Old Norse cognate Haward (Hávarðr), which means "high guard" and as a surname also with the unrelated Hayward. In some rare cases it is from the Old English eowu hierde "ewe herd". In Anglo-Norman the French digram -ou- was often rendered as -ow- such as tour → tower, flour (western variant form of fleur) → flower, etc. (with svarabakhti). A diminutive is "Howie" and its shortened form is "Ward" (most common in the 19th century). Between 1900 and 1960, Howard ranked in the U.S. Top 200; between 1960 and 1990, it ranked in the U.S. Top 400; between 1990 and 2004, it ranked in the U.S. Top 600.  People with the given name Howard or its variants include:

Given name
 Howard Allen (1949–2020), American serial killer
 Howard Duane Allman (1946–1971), American guitar virtuoso
 Howard Anderson (disambiguation), name of several people
 Howard Andrew (1934–2021), American poker player
 Howard Ashman (1950–1991), American lyricist known for  Little Shop of Horrors, The Little Mermaid and Beauty and the Beast
 Howard Baker (disambiguation), name of several people
 Howard Bragman (1956–2023), American crisis manager and publicist
 Howard Burnett (athlete) (born 1961), Jamaican track and field athlete
 Howard J. Burnett (1929–2019), American president of Washington & Jefferson College
 Howard Carpendale (born 1946), German singer 
 Howard Carter (disambiguation), name of several people
 Howard Cosell (1918–1995), sports broadcaster
 Howard Ward Cunningham (born 1949), American founder of WikiWikiWeb
 Howard David, American sportscaster
 Howard Davies (disambiguation), name of several people
 Howard Davis (disambiguation), name of several people
 Howard Dean (born 1948), American politician
 Howard Donald (born 1968), English singer
 Howard Devoto (born Howard Trafford, 1952), English singer-songwriter
 Howard Duff (1913–1990), American actor
 Howard Eastman (born 1970), Guyanese-British boxer
 Howard Ehmke (1894–1959), American baseball pitcher
 Howard Eisenberg (born 1926), American author and journalist
 Howard Eisley (born 1972), American basketball player and coach
 Howard Engel (1931–2019), Canadian mystery writer
 Howard Eskin (born 1951), American sports radio personality
 Howard Evans (disambiguation), name of several people
 Howard Goodall (born 1958), British musician, musicologist and TV presenter
 Howard Grant (boxer) (born 1966), Jamaican-Canadian boxer
 Howard Hawks (1896–1977), American producer
 Howard Hesseman (1940–2022), American actor
 Howard A. Howe (1901–1976), American virologist
 Howard Hughes (1905–1976), American aviation pioneer and film mogul
 Howard Jacobson (born 1942), British novelist and journalist
 Howard Johnson (disambiguation), name of several people
 Howard Jones (disambiguation), name of several people
 Howard Judd (1935–2007), American physician and medical researcher
 Howard Keel (1919–2004), singer and actor born Harry Keel
 Howard Kendall, English football player and manager
 Howard Andrew Knox (1885–1949), American physician
 Howard Lassoff (1955–2013), American-Israeli basketball player
 Howard Lederer (born 1964), professional poker player
 Howard Lesnick (1931–2020), American, Jefferson B. Fordham Professor of Law, University of Pennsylvania Law School
 Howard Long (1905–1939), American convicted murderer
 H. P. Lovecraft (1890–1937), American writer (full name Howard Phillips Lovecraft)
 Howard McNear (1905–1969), American radio and television actor
 Howard Marks (1945–2016), teacher, drug smuggler and author
 Howard Matthews (1885–1963), English footballer
 Howard W. Mattson (1927–1998), American chemist and journalist
 Howard T. Odum (1924–2002), American ecologist
 Howard Allen O'Brien, birth name of American writer Anne Rice
 Howard Payne (athlete) (1931–1992), English hammer thrower
 Howard Schatz, American fine art photographer
 Howard Shore (born 1946), Canadian composer
 Howard Smith (disambiguation), name of several people
 Howard Smothers (born 1973), American football player
 Howard Spira, American gambler who was paid by George Steinbrenner to find dirt on baseball player Dave Winfield
 Howard Stableford (born 1959), British television and radio presenter
 Howard Staunton (1810–1874), British chess player and Shakespearean scholar
 Howard Stern (born 1954), American talk-radio host
 Howard K. Stern (born 1968), attorney for Anna Nicole Smith
 Howard Stidham (born 1954), American football player
Howard Stupp (born 1955), Canadian Olympic wrestler
 Howard Tayler (born 1968), American cartoonist
 Howard Turner (1897–1976), American football player
 Howard Unruh (1921–2009), American spree killer
 Howard Wales (1943–2020), American musician
 Howard Walker (disambiguation), name of several people
 Howard Walter (1883–1918), American Congregationalist minister and hymnist
 Howard Watt (1911–2005), South African rugby union player
 Howard Watts III (born 1987), American politician
 Howard Wilkinson (born 1943), English football manager
 Howard Williams (disambiguation), name of several people
 Howard Wilson (born 1995), American football player
 Howard Wilson (physicist), British physicist
 Howard Zinn (1922–2010), American historian, academic, author, playwright, and social activist

Howie
 Howie B (born 1963), Scottish musician and producer Howard Bernstein
 Howie Carr (born 1952), American journalist
 Howie Day (born 1981), American singer-songwriter
 Howie Dorough (born 1973), American musician with Backstreet Boys
 Howie Epstein (1955–2003), American musician
 Howie Gordon (later known as Richard Pacheco), American pornographic actor
 Howie Hawkins, American politician and activist
 Howie Long (born 1960), American former football player and actor
 Howie Mandel (born 1955), Canadian comedian and actor, host of the TV show Deal or No Deal
 Howie Meeker (1923–2020), Canadian hockey player, TV sports announcer, Member of Parliament
 Howie Morenz (1902–1937), Canadian ice hockey player
 Howie Nave (born 1956), American comedian, radio personality, writer, promoter and movie critic
 Howie Rose (born 1954), American sportscaster
 Howie Severino (born 1961), Filipino broadcast journalist
 Howie Winter (1929–2020), American mobster

Fictional characters
 Howard Bellamy (Doctors), in the British soap opera Doctors
 Howard Clifford, a fictional villain in the Detective Pikachu movie
 Howard Cunningham (Happy Days), in the Happy Days TV series
 Howard Hamlin, a fictional character on the AMC television series Better Call Saul
 Howard Huge, a comic strip dog
 Howard Hunter, in the TV series Hill Street Blues, played by James B. Sikking
 Howard Langston, in the 1996 film Jingle All the Way
 Howard McBride, in the animated series The Loud House
 Howard McGreggor, in the TV series Fresh Meat (TV series)
 Howard Moon, in the TV series The Mighty Boosh, portrayed by Julian Barratt
 Howard Roark, protagonist of Ayn Rand's novel The Fountainhead
 Howard Stark, father of Iron Man Tony Stark
 Howard Wolowitz, a fictional character on the CBS television series The Big Bang Theory, portrayed by actor Simon Helberg.
 Howard the Duck, a comic book character
 Howard Link, a "Crow" and Inspector for the Black Order in the D. Gray Man Anime/Manga
 Howard Marner, a fictional character from Short Circuit (1986 film)
 Howard Silk, main character and agent in the TV series Counterpart (TV series)
 Howard DeVille, in the animated series Rugrats

References

English masculine given names
Given names originating from a surname